Tomori (Japanese: 友利) is both a surname and a given name. Notable people with the name include:

Surname
Ede Tomori (1920–1997), Hungarian photographer
Fikayo Tomori (born 1997), English footballer 
, Japanese golfer
, Japanese footballer
Oyewale Tomori (born 1946), Nigerian virologist
Pál Tomori (c. 1475 – 1526), Hungarian Roman Catholic monk and archbishop
, Japanese boxer
, Japanese baseball player
Zsuzsanna Tomori (born 1987), Hungarian handball player

Given name
, Japanese voice actress
, Japanese-Canadian artist

Japanese-language surnames
Japanese unisex given names